Electric Eye are a psychedelic rock group from Bergen, Norway formed in 2012 by Øystein Braut, Njål Clementsen, Anders Bjelland and Øyvind Hegg-Lunde. After their first single "Tangerine" they released their debut album "Pick-up, Lift-off, Space, Time" in 2013.

History
Electric Eye formed in 2012 and had their first appearance at  Hulen in Bergen, May 3, 2012. Electric Eye play droned out psych-rock inspired by the blues, Indian folk music and Rock n' Roll. Electric Eye released their debut LP “Pick-up, Lift-off, Space, Time” in April 2013 on Norwegian Klangkollektivet and UK label Fuzz Club Records. 
After the debut release, the band have been touring all over Europe, including appearances at Iceland Airwaves 2013, Eurosonic 2014, South By Southwest 2014 and The Great Escape Festival 2014.

Discography
Studio albums
Pick-up, Lift-off Space, Time (2013, Klangkollektivet, Goomah Music)
Different Sun (2016, Jansen Plateproduksjon)
Live At Blå (2016, Jansen Plateproduksjon)
From The Poisonous Tree (2017, Jansen Plateproduksjon)
Horizons (2021, Fuzz Club Records)

Singles
Tangerine (2013)
Bless (2015)
Mercury Rise (2016)
Turn Around, Face The Sun (2017)
Invisible Prison (2017)
Den Atmosfaeriske Elven (2021)
Put The Secret In Your Pocket (2021)

References

External links

Musical groups established in 2012
Norwegian psychedelic rock music groups
Musical groups from Bergen
2012 establishments in Norway